Jan Roland Holmgren (born March 25, 1944 in Borås, Sweden) is a Swedish physician, microbiologist, immunologist, and vaccinologist, known for his research on cholera and, specifically, for his leadership in developing "the world's first effective oral cholera vaccine".

Biography
At the University of Gothenburg (Göteborgs universitet in Swedish), Holmgren graduated in 1965 with a bachelor of medicine degree, in 1969 with a Ph.D., and in 1973 with an M.D. His 1969 doctoral dissertation dealt with immunological aspects of urinary tract infections in children. At the University of Gothenburg, he was appointed in 1969 a docent and in 1970 an associate professor. From 1971 to 1980 he held research positions at the Swedish Medical Research Council. In 1980 he was appointed to the University of Gothenburg's professorial chair in medical microbiology and immunology as successor to Örjan Ouchterlony upon the latter's retirement. In addition to his professorship, Holmgren was appointed director of the Göteborg University Vaccine Research Institute (GUVAX), which was created in 2002. He is the author or co-author of more than 600 scientific papers.

His research contributed to the development of a vaccine one against Enterotoxigenic Escherichia coli (ETEC). Furthermore, his research has applications to understanding immunological mechanisms, such as immunological tolerance by oral immunization, and also to transplant medicine and to developing vaccines against some autoimmune diseases and allergies.

He received in 1977 the Swedish Academy of Sciences Prize for Medicine (Hilda and Alfred Erikssons Prize) and in 1994 both the Louis-Jeantet Prize for Medicine and the Söderbergska Prize of the Swedish Medical Society. He received in 2017 the Albert B. Sabin Gold Medal and in 2018 the Prince Mahidol Award in Public Health. He is a member of the Royal Swedish Academy of Science and the Swedish Academy of Engineering. He was a board member of the Knut and Alice Wallenberg Foundation from 1995 to 2017 and has served on the boards of other national and international organizations for research on vaccines, infections, and global health; the other organizations include the Global Alliance for Vaccines and Immunization (GAVI) and the International Vaccine Institute (IVI).

He married Ann-Mari Svennerholm, who was his first Ph.D. student. They have worked together since 1970. They have a son and two daughters.

Selected publications

References

Swedish immunologists
Swedish microbiologists
20th-century Swedish physicians
21st-century Swedish physicians
Vaccinologists
University of Gothenburg alumni
Academic staff of the University of Gothenburg
Members of the Royal Swedish Academy of Engineering Sciences
Members of the Royal Swedish Academy of Sciences
1944 births
Living people